Austroginellinae is a taxonomic subfamily within the larger family of Marginellidae, a group of small sea snails, marine gastropod molluscs in the superfamily Volutoidea.

Genera
 Alaginella Laseron, 1957
 Austroginella Laseron, 1957
 Caribeginella Espinosa & Ortea, 1998
 Hydroginella Laseron, 1957
 Marigordiella Espinosa & Ortea, 2010
 Mesoginella Laseron, 1957
 Ovaginella Laseron, 1957
 Protoginella Laseron, 1957
 Serrata Jousseaume, 1875
Genera brought into synonymy
 Carinaginella Laseron, 1957: synonym of Alaginella Laseron, 1957
 Cassoginella Laseron, 1957 †: synonym of Alaginella Laseron, 1957
 Deviginella Laseron, 1957: synonym of Mesoginella Laseron, 1957
 Haloginella Laseron, 1957: synonym of Serrata Jousseaume, 1875
 Neptoginella Laseron, 1957: synonym of Hydroginella Laseron, 1957
 Pillarginella Gabriel, 1962: synonym of Hydroginella Laseron, 1957
 Plicaginella Laseron, 1957: synonym of Austroginella Laseron, 1957
 Serrataginella G. A. Coovert & H. K. Coovert, 1995: synonym of Serrata Jousseaume, 1875
 Sinuginella Laseron, 1957: synonym of Mesoginella Laseron, 1957
 Spiroginella Laseron, 1957: synonym of Mesoginella Laseron, 1957
 Triginella Laseron, 1957: synonym of Alaginella Laseron, 1957

References

External links

 A.E., Caballer Gutierrez M., Buge B., Sorokin P.V., Puillandre N., Bouchet P. (2019 [20 September). Mapping the missing branch on the neogastropod tree of life: molecular phylogeny of marginelliform gastropods. Journal of Molluscan Studies.]

Marginellidae